Westermoen Hydrofoil was a shipyard located in Mandal, Norway, which has specialized in high speed craft, and pioneered many designs.

The yard was established in 1961 by Toralf Westermoen, who had also started Westermoen Båtbyggeri og Mek Verksted.  The yard began producing hydrofoil craft under license from Italian Supramar. 

The first boat, Westfoil, with a top speed of 38 knots, was finished in 1962 and was delivered to the Bahamas.  After that, a number of small and large (models PT20 and PT50) hydrofoils were built for passenger traffic in western Norway, in the Oslofjord, Øresund, Bahamas and in Greece.

Towards the end of the 1960 they built the world's then-largest hydrofoil, the "Expressen", that could carry 250 passengers.  The boat did not achieve the intended design speed of 38 knots, and the contract was annulled.  This was the beginning of the end of the hydrofoil epoch in Mandal.

After this, development of a new class of high speed vessel, the catamaran, began.  The Westamaran type, constructed by commander Harald Henriksen and introduced in 1973, was very successful, and a new era of high speed craft in Norway and elsewhere was begun.

Towards the end of the 1980s the yard changed name to Westamarin. Westamarin closed in the end of the 1990s.

One of the final ships produced was a single High-speed Sea Service HSS 900 catamaran for Stena Line in 1997. The shipyard went bankrupt shortly afterwards, leading to Stena Line being unable to claim compensation for corrosion later found to the aluminium alloy hull on the vessel (Stena Carisma).

Productions

SS:
1969 Nefelin 3
1973 Juvikingen
1973 Solundir
1983 Vøringen

W86:
1971 Fjordglytt
1971 Kosterfjord, bnr 21
1972 Fjordtroll, bnr 24
1972 Mayflower
1972 Karmsund
1973 Kongsbussen, bnr 27
1973 Hertugbussen, bnr 28
1973 Tedno, bnr 29
1973 Koegelwieck, bnr 32
1973 Olavsbussen
1973 Haugesund, bnr 35
1975 Storesund, bnr 41
1975 Fjordkongen, bnr 42
1975 Brynilen, bnr 44
1975 Øygar, bnr 45
1976 Fjorddronningen, bnr 46
1976 Highland Seabird, bnr 47
1976 Fjorddrott, bnr 48
1977 Fjordprinsessen, bnr 49, Avdeling Alta
1977 Steigtind, bnr 50, Avdeling Alta
1978 Mediteran, bnr 54
1978 Hornøy 3, bnr 66 Avdeling Alta
1978 Marina 1, bnr 67 Avdeling Alta 

W95:
1974 Vingtor, bnr 36
1974 Sleipner, bnr37
1975 Sunnhordland, bnr 38
1975 Martini Bianco, bnr 40
1975 Westjet, bnr 43
1977 Draupner, bnr 51
1977 Tunen, bnr 52
1977 Tranen, bnr 53
1977 Pegasus
1979 Tumleren
1981 Alisur Amarillo, bnr 79
1981 Tromsprinsen, bnr 80
1981 Celestina, bnr 81, Avdeling Alta
1982 Venture 83, bnr 83
1982 Venture 84, bnr 84

W88:
1981 Haugesund, bnr 78, Avdeling Alta
1981 Midthordaland, bnr 82
1985 Skogøy
1986 Fjordsol

W100:
1980 Gimle Belle, bnr 75
1981 Gimle Bird, bnr 76
1981 Gimle Bay, bnr 77

References

External links 
 Westfoil

Shipbuilding companies of Norway
Defunct companies of Norway
Shipyards of Norway